The 21st Sarasaviya Awards festival (Sinhala: 21වැනි සරසවිය සම්මාන උලෙළ), presented by the Associated Newspapers of Ceylon Limited, was held to honor the best films of 1992 Sinhala cinema on March 20, 1993, at the Bandaranaike Memorial International Conference Hall, Colombo 07, Sri Lanka at 6:00 p.m. Prime Minister D. B. Wijetunga was the chief guest at the awards nights.

The film Kulageya won the most awards with five including Best Film.

Awards

References

Sarasaviya Awards
Sarasaviya